Franklin Township is an inactive township in Miller County, in the U.S. state of Missouri.

Franklin Township was established in 1860, and named after the local Franklin family.

References

Townships in Missouri
Townships in Miller County, Missouri